The Aston Martin DBRS9 was a racing car built by Aston Martin Racing to be a cheaper alternative to the Aston Martin DBR9, both of which are based on the Aston Martin DB9. The DBRS9 was introduced in 2005 and has since been replaced with the Aston Martin V12 Vantage GT3.

Development

The DBRS9 features several modifications to the standard DB9. These enhancements bring the DBRS9's power output up to 430 bhp/tonne.

The car also features uprated suspension with a lowered ride height and stiffened racing springs. The DBRS9 has also been fitted with a close-ratio racing gearbox in either 6-speed fully manual or an upgraded sequential manual form.

The DBRS9 is open to customers through Aston Martin Racing and Prodrive at a price of approximately £175,000 without optional extras and taxes. The car is a bridge between the highly expensive, fully race specification GT1 Aston Martin DBR9 and the standard DB9 road car.

References

External links

 Aston Martin Racing DBRS9 GT3

Grand tourer racing cars
DBRS9